Disappearance is a 2019 American thriller film directed by Matt Shapira and starring Reggie Lee, Matthew Marsden, Cortney Palm and Hutch Dano. The trailer released by Gravitas Ventures.

Plot
After the disappearance of mystery author George Belanger from his sailboat, Detective Park must sort through stories of George's mistress, George's wife, and the boat captain, to ascertain if there was foul play, or if George simply left for greener pastures.

Cast
 Reggie Lee as Detective Park
 Matthew Marsden as George Belanger
 Cortney Palm as Isabelle Belanger
 Hutch Dano as Blake
 Jemma Dallender as Cecile
 Chloe Catherine Kim as Samantha
 Brian Thompson as Captain Cody
 Guy Wilson as Detective Bailey

References

External links
 
 

2019 films
2010s English-language films
American thriller films
2019 thriller films
2010s American films